Lithocarpus leptogyne is a tree in the beech family Fagaceae. The specific epithet  is from the Greek, referring to the slender female flower.

Description
The greyish bark is smooth or lenticellate. The flowers are solitary along the rachis.

Distribution and habitat
Lithocarpus leptogyne grows naturally in Peninsular Malaysia, Sumatra and Borneo. Its habitat is mixed dipterocarp to montane forests up to  altitude.

References

leptogyne
Flora of Malaya
Flora of Sumatra
Flora of Borneo
Plants described in 1844